Kondak may refer to:
Kondak, Iran, a village in Khuzestan Province, Iran
Kondak-e Saraydin, a village in Khuzestan Province, Iran
Kondak, Armenian term for pastoral letter

See also
Kondakar, Slavonic variant of Greek kontakarion, book containing kontakion-type Eastern Orthodox hymns
Kondek
Gondek (disambiguation)